HMS Alresford was a Hunt-class minesweeper of the Aberdare sub-class built for the Royal Navy during World War I. She was not finished in time to participate in the First World War and survived the Second World War to be sold for scrap in 1947.

Design and description
The Aberdare sub-class were enlarged versions of the original Hunt-class ships with a more powerful armament. The ships displaced  at normal load. The ships' complement consisted of 74 officers and ratings.

The ships had two vertical triple-expansion steam engines, each driving one shaft, using steam provided by two Yarrow boilers.

The Aberdare sub-class was armed with a quick-firing (QF)  gun forward of the bridge and a QF twelve-pounder (76.2 mm) anti-aircraft gun aft. Some ships were fitted with six- or three-pounder guns in lieu of the twelve-pounder.

Construction and career
HMS Alresford was built by the Ailsa Shipbuilding Company at their shipyard in Troon, Ayrshire. In 1936–38, she was a tender to the navigation school, and was used for local running in the Portsmouth area, training officers in pilotage. Alresford took part in Operation Dynamo and the Dieppe Raid.

Notes

References
 
 
 

 

Hunt-class minesweepers (1916)
Royal Navy ship names
1919 ships